Wang Kemin (Wade-Giles: Wang K'o-min, May 4, 1879 – December 25, 1945)  was a leading official in the Chinese republican movement and early Beiyang government, later noted for his role as in the collaborationist Provisional Government of the Republic of China and Wang Jingwei regime during World War II.

Biography 

Wang was a native of Hangzhou in Zhejiang province.  In 1901, he was dispatched by the government of Qing Dynasty China to Japan, where he studied western economics and accounting from his nominal position as attaché at the Chinese embassy in Tokyo. After his return to China in 1907, he was appointed to a post under the Viceroy of Zhili to manage foreign affairs. After the Republic of China had been established, he was sent to France in 1913. On his return, by orders of Duan Qirui he helped establish the Bank of China, and became its president from July 1917. He served as minister of finance under the Beiyang Government from December 1917 to March 1918. In December 1918, he was the only representative of the Beiyang Government to attend a meeting with the Nanjing Government in an attempt to reunify China.

He served as Minister of Finance again from July–August 1923 under the premiership of Gao Lingwei. However, Wang was strongly opposed by the Fengtian clique led by Zhang Zuolin, and forced to resign his post after only a week. He returned as Minister of Finance with the support of Cao Kun of the Zhili clique from November 1923-October 1924. During this time, he also oversaw the operations of a number of other banks, including the Bank of Tianjin.

After the success of Chiang Kai-shek's Northern Expedition a warrant for Wang's arrest was issued by the Kuomintang and he fled to Dalian in the Kwantung Leased Territory under Japanese jurisdiction.

In 1931, Wang Kemin returned to Beijing when Zhang Xueliang took control of Hebei Province, and took a post in the Peking Finance committee. He became mayor of Tianjin in 1932. In 1935 Wang was in the Kuomintang Hebei Government and had a post in the Northeast Government Affairs Committee, and the Peking Government Affairs Committee and other important posts. However, he retired to Shanghai in 1935.

After the Second Sino-Japanese War broke out in 1937, the Imperial Japanese Army quickly overran North China, and the Japanese Imperial General Headquarters authorized the creation of a collaborationist regime as part of its overall strategy to establish an autonomous buffer zone between China and Japanese-controlled Manchukuo. This government was based in Beijing, and proclaimed Wang Kemin accepted the post of President of the Provisional Government of the Republic of China, with its capital in Beijing on December 14, 1937. The government nominally controlled the provinces of Hebei, Shandong, Shanxi, Henan and Jiangsu. But its activities were carefully prescribed and overseen by advisors provided by the Japanese Northern China Area Army. The failure of the Japanese to give any real authority to the Provisional Government discredited it in the eyes of the local inhabitants, and made its existence of only limited propaganda utility to the Japanese authorities.

The Provisional Government was, along with the Reformed Government of the Republic of China, merged into Wang Jingwei's Nanjing Nationalist Government on March 30, 1940, but in practical terms actually remained virtually independent under the name of the "North China Political Council" until the end of the war. Wang Kemin retained power as Chairman of the North China Political Council, as well as becoming Internal Affairs Minister in the Nanjing Nationalist Government.

Wang was arrested by the government of the Republic of China after the surrender of Japan and tried for treason. He committed suicide before the conclusion of his trial on December 25, 1945.

References

Bibliography 
 David P. Barrett and Larry N. Shyu, eds.; Chinese Collaboration with Japan, 1932-1945: The Limits of Accommodation Stanford University Press 2001
 John H. Boyle, China and Japan at War, 1937–1945: The Politics of Collaboration (Harvard University Press, 1972).  
 James C. Hsiung and Steven I. Levine, eds., China's Bitter Victory: The War with Japan, 1937–1945 (Armonk, N.Y.: M. E. Sharpe, 1992)
 Ch'i Hsi-sheng, Nationalist China at War: Military Defeats and Political Collapse, 1937–1945 (Ann Arbor: University of Michigan Press, 1982). 
 Frederick W. Mote, Japanese-Sponsored Governments in China, 1937–1945 (Stanford University Press, 1954).
 Howard L Boorman and Richard C. Howard, eds.; Biographical Dictionary of Republican China, Volume I: AI - CH'U, Columbia University Press, 1967.

External links 
  王克敏  biography

1879 births  
1945 suicides
Republic of China politicians from Zhejiang
Chinese collaborators with Imperial Japan
World War II political leaders
Chinese politicians who committed suicide
Prisoners who died in Chinese detention
People who committed suicide in prison custody
Politicians from Hangzhou
Qing dynasty politicians from Zhejiang